Doris Amelia Blackburn (18 September 1889 – 12 December 1970) was an Australian social reformer and politician. She served in the House of Representatives from 1946 to 1949, the second woman after Enid Lyons to do so. Blackburn was a prominent socialist and originally a member of the Labor Party. She was married to Maurice Blackburn, a Labor MP, but he was expelled from the party in 1937 and she resigned from the party in solidarity. Her husband died in 1944, and she was elected to his former seat at the 1946 federal election – the first woman elected to parliament as an independent. However, Blackburn served only a single term before being defeated. She later served as president of the Women's International League for Peace and Freedom.

Early life
Born in Hawthorn, Melbourne, Victoria to Lebbeus Hordern, estate agent, and his wife Louisa Dewson (née Smith), Doris Hordern became involved in women's rights and peace issues from a young age and served as the campaign secretary of Vida Goldstein, the first woman to stand for election to federal parliament in Australia. She married Maurice Blackburn, a fellow firebrand socialist, in Melbourne on 10 December 1914 and spent their honeymoon organising anti-war and anti-conscription campaigns.

Politics
While her husband served at different times as an Australian Labor Party (ALP)  member of the Victorian and Federal parliaments, Blackburn continued to work on social issues, some of which brought her into conflict with the Labor Party (of which she too was a member) and following Maurice's expulsion from the party in 1937, she resigned from the ALP. Her husband continued to sit in parliament as an independent but lost his seat at the 1943 federal election to the official Labor candidate, and died the following year.

Parliament
Upset at Labor's treatment of her husband, Blackburn stood as an Independent Labour candidate for her husband's old seat of Bourke at the 1946 election, and by winning it she became only the second woman to be elected to the Australian House of Representatives.

In parliament Blackburn, who shared the cross benches with fellow former Labor member Jack Lang, championed similar issues to those of her late  husband, gaining nationwide notoriety in 1947 as the only MP to vote against the Atomic Energy Bill. She served as the national President of the Council for Civil Liberties. Following an electoral redistribution, her seat of Bourke was abolished, and at the 1949 election she contested the newly established seat of Wills. In a contest with both the Labor and Liberal parties she came third with 20 percent. Standing in Wills again at the 1951 election she also came third with 17 percent of the vote. Both times the seat was convincingly won by Labor.

Affiliations
As of September 1949, Blackburn was a charter member of the Australian Peace Council.

Blackburn subsequently remained active in social issues, serving as president of the Women's International League for Peace and Freedom. Realising the problems faced by Aborigines, following a visit to the Woomera Rocket Range, she co-founded, with Douglas Nicholls, the Aborigines Advancement League and the Federal Council for Aboriginal Advancement.

Death
Blackburn died on 12 December 1970 in Coburg, Victoria, aged 81, survived by her two sons and one of her two daughters.

See also
 List of peace activists

References

External links
 Entry for D. Blackburn in the Australian Dictionary of Biography Online Edition
The Blackburns: Private Lives, Public Ambition, Carolyn Rasmussen, Melbourne University Press, 2019, 

1889 births
1970 deaths
Australian socialists
Australian Labor Party members of the Parliament of Australia
Members of the Australian House of Representatives
Members of the Australian House of Representatives for Bourke
Independent members of the Parliament of Australia
Women members of the Australian House of Representatives
Australian women of World War I
Spouses of Australian politicians
Women's International League for Peace and Freedom people
20th-century Australian politicians
19th-century Australian women
Australian pacifists
20th-century Australian women politicians